Motijheel is a thana (administrative division) of Dhaka, Bangladesh. It is at the heart of the city (the General Post Office is considered the zero point of Dhaka). Motijheel is the major business and commercial hub of Dhaka city and has more offices and business institutions than any other part of the city. It is the home to largest number of corporate headquarters in the nation. Many news, magazines, print and other media publishers are based here. Motijheel is close to Dhaka Railway Station, Dhaka's main station. One of the highest skyscrapers of the megacity are in this area. It is the central business district. City Centre Dhaka and Bangladesh Bank Building are in this area. The iconic landmark of Shapla in Shapla Square is the central point where all major roads to the place converge.

Geography
It is bounded by Khilgaon Thana to the north, Sutrapur and Kotwali Thanas to the south, Sabujbagh Thana to the east, and Ramna Thana to the west.

Demographics
At the 1991 Bangladesh census, Motijheel had 36,059 households with a population of 223,676, of whom 143,497 were age 18 or older. Males constituted 59.45% of the population, and females 40.55%. Motijheel had an average literacy rate of 70.9% (7+ years), against the national average of 32.4% (The present national average is 72%).

Education

According to Banglapedia, T & T High School is a notable secondary school. Notre Dame College, Dhaka , Notre Dame University Bangladesh one of the country's newest educational institutions, is located in Motijheel. The main branch of Ideal School & College and Motijheel Model School & College is also located in Motijheel.

Gallery

Media

The following newspapers and magazine publishers are based in Motijheel:
 The Daily Observer
 The Financial Express
 Jugantar

See also
Upazilas of Bangladesh
Districts of Bangladesh
Divisions of Bangladesh

References

External links

 
Thanas of Dhaka
Central business districts in Bangladesh
Financial districts in Bangladesh